Qarah Tappeh-ye Ashayiri-ye Do (also Romanized as Qarah Tappeh-ye ʿAshāyīrī-ye Do; also known as Qarahtapeh) is a village in Golestan Rural District, in the Central District of Sirjan County, Kerman Province, Iran. At the 2006 census, its population was 60, in 17 families.

References 

Populated places in Sirjan County